Francesca Milani (born 25 September 1993) is an Italian judoka. Born in Rome, in 2018 she won one of the bronze medals in the women's 48 kg event at the Mediterranean Games held in Tarragona, Spain. She competed at the World Judo Championships in 2017, 2018 and 2021. She competed at the 2020 Summer Olympics held in Tokyo, Japan.

Career 
In 2020, she was eliminated in her first match in the women's 48 kg event at the European Judo Championships held in Prague, Czech Republic. 

In 2021, she won the silver medal in her event at the Judo Grand Slam Tbilisi held in Tbilisi, Georgia and the gold medal at the Judo Grand Slam Antalya held in Antalya, Turkey. In June 2021, she competed in the women's 48 kg event at the World Judo Championships held in Budapest, Hungary. In July 2021, she represented Italy at the 2020 Summer Olympics in Tokyo, Japan. She competed in the women's 48 kg event where she was eliminated in her first match by Lin Chen-hao of Chinese Taipei.

She won the silver medal in her event at the 2022 Judo Grand Slam Tel Aviv held in Tel Aviv, Israel.

References

External links
 
 
 

Living people
1993 births
Sportspeople from Rome
Italian female judoka
Judoka at the 2019 European Games
European Games competitors for Italy
Mediterranean Games bronze medalists for Italy
Mediterranean Games medalists in judo
Competitors at the 2018 Mediterranean Games
Judoka at the 2020 Summer Olympics
Olympic judoka of Italy
21st-century Italian women